Meredith Hilliard Hopkins (February 22, 1907 - November 20, 1963) was a Major League Baseball player. He played two seasons in the majors as a reserve infielder, mostly at third base. Hopkins was sent to the minor league St. Paul Saints a month into the season, then was acquired by the Chicago White Sox in June.

Sources

Major League Baseball third basemen
Philadelphia Phillies players
Chicago White Sox players
Jersey City Skeeters players
St. Paul Saints (AA) players
Kansas City Blues (baseball) players
Baseball players from Texas
Texas Longhorns baseball players
1907 births
1963 deaths
People from Wolfe City, Texas